Eswatini (formerly Swaziland) is divided into four regions: Hhohho, Lubombo, Manzini, and Shiselweni.  Each region is further divided into tinkhundla. There are 55 tinkhundla in Eswatini and each elects one representative to the House of Assembly of Eswatini. Tinkhundla are, in turn, divided into smaller imiphakatsi.

References

 
Subdivisions of Eswatini
Eswatini 1
Eswatini 1
Eswatini geography-related lists